Julieta Lazcano (born 25 July 1989) is an Argentine volleyball player who participated with the Argentina national team at the Pan-American Volleyball Cup (in 2006, 2015, 2016), the FIVB Volleyball World Grand Prix (in 2011, 2014, 2015, 2016), the 2014 FIVB Volleyball Women's World Championship in Italy, the 2015 FIVB Volleyball Women's World Cup in Japan, the 2015 Pan American Games in Canada, the 2016 Summer Olympics in Brazil, and the 2018 FIVB Volleyball Women's World Championship.

Lazcano has also played at junior level for the Argentine national team.

At club level played for Poeta Lugones, General Paz Juniors, Municipalidad de Córdoba, Olímpico de Freyre, Pesaro, Gimnasia y Esgrima (La Plata), Nancy and Istres before moving to Paris Saint Cloud in 2016.

Clubs
  Club Poeta Lugones (2002–2004)
  General Paz Juniors (2004–2006)
  Club Municipalidad de Córdoba (2006–2006)
  Olimpico Freyre (2006–2007)
  Scavolini Pesaro (2007–2009)
  Gimnasia y Esgrima (LP) (2009–2011)
  Vandœuvre Nancy (2011–2013)
  Istres (2013–2016)
  Paris Saint Cloud (2016–2017)
  Saint Raphael Var Volley-Ball (2017-2018)
  Curitiba Vôlei (2018-2019)
  E.Leclerc Radomka Radom (2019-2020)

References

External links
 Profile at CEV
 Profile  at Lega Pallavolo Serie A Femminile (Italian Serie A)
 Profile  at Ligue Nationale de Volley (LNV)

1989 births
Living people
Argentine women's volleyball players
Sportspeople from Córdoba, Argentina
Volleyball players at the 2015 Pan American Games
Olympic volleyball players of Argentina
Volleyball players at the 2016 Summer Olympics
Middle blockers
Volleyball players at the 2019 Pan American Games
Pan American Games medalists in volleyball
Pan American Games bronze medalists for Argentina
Medalists at the 2019 Pan American Games
Volleyball players at the 2020 Summer Olympics
21st-century Argentine women